The short program of figure skating is the first of two segments of competitions, skated before the free skating program. It lasts, for both senior and junior singles and pair skaters, 2 minutes and 40 seconds.  In synchronized skating, for both juniors and seniors, the short program lasts 2 minutes and 50 seconds. Vocal music with lyrics is allowed for all disciplines since the 2014-2015 season. The short program for single skaters and for pair skaters consists of seven required elements, and there are six required elements for synchronized skaters.

Overview

The short program, along with the free skating program, is a segment of single skating, pair skating, and synchronized skating in international competitions and events for both junior and senior-level skaters. It has been previously called the "original" or "technical" program. The short program was added to single skating in 1973, which created a three-part competition until compulsory figures were eliminated in 1990. The short program for pair skating was introduced at the 1963 European Championships, the 1964 World Championships, and the Olympics in 1968; previously, pair skaters only had to perform the free skating program in competitions. Synchronized skating has always had two competition segments, the short program and free skating.

The short program must be skated before the free skate. It lasts, for both senior and junior singles and pairs, 2 minutes and 40 seconds. In synchronized skating, for both juniors and seniors, the short program lasts 2 minutes and 50 seconds, "but may be less". Vocal music with lyrics is allowed in all disciplines since the 2014-2015 season. The first time vocal music was allowed at the Olympics was in 2018.

Pair skating, which has never included a compulsory phase like the other figure skating disciplines, did not require a short program until the early 1960s, when the ISU "instituted a short program of required moves" as the first part of pair competitions. The short program for pair skating first appeared at the European Championships in 1963, the World Championships in 1964, and the Olympics in 1968. The arrangement of the specific moves, also unlike compulsory figures for single skaters and the compulsory dance for ice dancers, were up to each pair team. According to writer Ellyn Kestnbaum, the short programs introduced in single men and women competitions in 1973 were modeled after the pair skating short program, and the structure of competitions in both single and pair competitions have been identical since the elimination of compulsory figures in 1990.

Skaters' and teams' entire performance during their short program is evaluated by three program components: composition, presentation, and skating skills. Both partners of pair skating and ice dancing teams must demonstrate the criteria equally. Unity, connections between and within elements, choreography reflecting the skaters' musical phrase and form, multidimensional movements and use of space, and pattern and ice coverage are considered when judges evaluate skaters' composition, which the ISU defines as "the intentional, developed and/or original arrangement of the repertoire of all types of movements into a meaningful whole according to the principles of proportion, unity, space, pattern, and musical structure". When evaluating skaters' presentation, which is defined as "the demonstration of engagement, commitment and involvement based on an understanding of the music and composition", judges must take into account skaters' expressiveness and projection the variety and contrast of their energy and movements, their musical sensitivity and timing, and for pair skaters and ice dancers, unison, oneness and awareness of space. The following must be considered when judging skaters' skating skills, which is defined as "the ability of the Skater to execute the skating repertoire of steps, turns, and skating movement, with blade and body control": variety of edges, steps, turns, movements and directions; clarity of edges, steps, turns, movements and body control; balance and glide; power and speed; and flow.

Nathan Chen from the United States holds the highest recorded single men’s short program score at 113.97, which he scored at the 2022 Beijing Olympics. Russian skater Kamila Valieva holds the highest single women's short program score of 90.45, which she earned at the 2022 European Championships in Tallinn, Estonia. Chinese pairs team Sui Wenjing and Han Cong hold the highest pair skating short program score of 84.41, which they earned at 2022 Beijing Olympics. Wenjing and Cong also hold the two highest short program scores.

Requirements 
The short program for senior single skaters consists of seven required elements. The sequence of the elements is optional. Skaters can choose their own music, but their programs must be skated in harmony with it. 

Men single senior skaters must have the following elements in their short program:

 a double or triple Axel
 one triple or quadruple jump
 a jump combination consisting of either a double jump and a triple jump, two triple jumps, a quadruple jump and a double jump, or a triple jump
 one flying spin
 a camel spin or sit spin with just one change of foot
 a spin combination with just one change of foot
 a step sequence using the entire ice surface.

Women single senior skaters must have the following elements in their short program:

 a double or triple Axel
 one triple jump
 a jump combination consisting of either a double jump and a triple jump, or two triple jumps.
 one flying spin
 either a layback/sideways leaning spin or a sit or camel spin without a change of foot
 a spin combination with just one change of foot
 a step sequence using the entire ice surface.

Junior single skaters also have seven required elements, in any sequence, but with three groups of variations depending on the season. For example, men in the junior division had to skate the following elements in 2022-2023: one double or triple Axel jump; a double or triple loop jump; one jump combination consisting of either one double jump and a triple jump or two triple jumps; one flying camel spin; a sit spin with just one change of foot; a spin combination with just one change of foot; and a step sequence using the entire ice surface. Junior women had to skate these elements: a double or triple flip jump; one jump combination consisting of two double jumps, one double and one triple jump, or two triple jumps; a flying sit spin; a layback and/or sideway leaning spin or a camel spin without a change of foot; a spin combination with just one change of foot; and a step sequence using the entire ice surface.

Senior male single skaters can execute any triple or quadruple jump they like, although when a quadruple jump is executed in a jump combination, a different quadruple jump can be included as a solo jump. Senior men and women and junior men cannot execute an additional Axel jump to fulfill the second requirement of a triple or quadruple jump and it cannot be repeated as a solo jump or jump combination. Senior women can choose any triple jump for the second requirement, but junior men and women can only execute the prescribed double or triple jump. All levels of skaters must execute different jumps in their jump combinations than the jump they choose to fulfill their solo jump requirement. However, senior men can choose the same jump or a different double, triple, or quadruple jump, but when they execute a quadruple jump to fulfill their quadruple or triple jump requirement (#2), they can include a different quadruple jump in their jump combination. Senior women and junior men and women can include either the same jump or a different double or triple jump in their combination jump. If a skater executes an extra jump or jumps, "only the individual jump(s) which is not according to requirements will have no value". Jumps are judged in the order of their execution.

A skater will not get any credit for spins "if there is no spin position before and/or after the change of foot" and if it does not have at least three revolutions. Only flying spins can begin with a jump. Seniors can choose to execute any type of flying spin with a landing position different from the spin in one position, but juniors can only execute the prescribed type of flying spin. When awarding the grade of execution for a flying spin, judges must ascertain whether or not skaters performed a step-over while executing it. Only eight revolutions in the landing position can be different from the flying position. No previous rotation can be done before the skater takes off for the flying spin and the "required eight revolutions can be executed in any variation of the landing position". Both senior and junior men can execute their spins with only one change of foot, but senior men must choose to execute either the sit position or camel position of their chosen spin and this position must be different from the landing position of their flying spin. The ISU also requires that "[t]he spin must consist of only one change of foot, which may be executed in the form of a step over or a jump with not less than six revolutions on each foot in the chosen basic position". Junior men can only perform the prescribed camel or sit position and the spin must have only one change of foot, which can be done in either the form of a jump with no fewer than six revolutions on each foot in the basic position they have chosen or in the form of a step-over. 

When women single skaters execute a layback- or sideways-leaning spin, they can assume any position they like, but only if "the basic layback or sideways leaning position is maintained for eight revolutions without rising to an upright position". They can execute a Biellmann position after they have completed the required eight revolutions and can spin in one position without a change of foot for a minimum of eight revolutions in this position and with any variation and/or variations in the chosen position. For both men and women, "[i]f the landing position of the Flying spin is the same that in the Spin in one position, the last performed of these two spins will not be counted", but will be marked by the judges as complete.

Spin combinations must include just one change of foot, which may be executed in the form of a jump or a step-over, with no fewer than six revolutions on each foot. Skaters can execute their change of position or change of foot either at the same time or separately. Step sequences can include any unlisted jumps.

Pair skating

Both junior and senior pair skaters have seven required elements, but with three groups of variations depending on the season. For example, seniors during the 2022-2023 season had to perform the following: any lasso lift take-off; either a double or triple twist lift; either a double or triple throw jump; either a double or triple solo jump; a solo spin combination with just one change of foot; a backward-inside death spiral; and a step sequence using the entire ice surface. Junior pair skaters also had three groups of required elements. In 2022-2023, they had the same requirements as senior teams, although with two differences: they had to perform either a double or triple toe loop throw jump or their choice of a flip throw jump or a Lutz throw jump; and either a double loop solo jump or a double Axel solo jump. The sequence of the elements is optional and their short programs must be skated in harmony with the music they choose.

Only the prescribed overhead lift take-off and death spiral are allowed. Both junior and senior pair skaters can only perform either a Lutz or flip take-off by the woman, but women can only perform two or three free rotations in the air. Seniors can perform any double or triple jump and throw jump, but juniors can only perform what has been prescribed. Seniors can perform any double or triple solo jump, but juniors can only perform the prescribed jump. Their solo spin combination "must have a minimum of two different basic positions with two revolutions in each of these positions by both partners anywhere within the spin", both partners must perform all three basic positions to earn its full value, and can begin with a jump. For spin combinations, pair skaters "must include only one change of foot with not less than five revolutions on each foot by both partners". The change of foot may be done in the form of either a jump or a step-over, and the change of foot and change of positions must be made either at the same time or separately. For step sequences, they have to be performed together or close together, and can include any unlisted jumps. Pair skaters may also perform short stops, if done "in accordance with the music".

Synchronized skating

In synchronized skating, both juniors and seniors must perform a maximum of six required elements. The sequence of the elements is optional. The ISU, out of the following 14 elements, chooses and publicizes the required elements for the junior and senior short program yearly. They include: one artistic element;  one creative element; an intersection element; a group lift element (but only for senior teams, when required); a block or line linear element; a move element; a mixed element; one no-hold element; a pair element; a block or line pivoting element; a circle or wheel rotating element; a synchronized spin element; a circle or wheel traveling element; and a twizzle element.

See also
 History of figure skating

References

Notes

Citations

Sources
 "Communication No. 2494: Single & Pair Skating/Ice Dance" (ISU No. 2494). Lausanne, Switzerland: International Skating Union. 30 June 2022. Retrieved 3 July 2022.
 Hines, James R. (2011). Historical Dictionary of Figure Skating. Lanham, Maryland: Scarecrow Press. .
 Kestnbaum, Ellyn (2003). Culture on Ice: Figure Skating and Cultural Meaning. Middletown, Connecticut: Wesleyan University Press. .
 "Special Regulations & Technical Rules Single & Pair Skating and Ice Dance 2022". (S&P/ID 2022) International Skating Union. 2022. Retrieved 28 September 2022.
 "Special Regulations & Technical Rules Synchronized Skating 2022". (SS Rules 2022) International Skating Union. 2022. Retrieved 28 September 2022.
 "Technical Panel Handbook: Single Skating 2020/2021" (PDF). ISU Judging System. International Skating Union. 20 July 2020. Retrieved 29 July 2020 (Tech Panel).

Figure skating